Bornholms Amt is a former county (Danish, amt) on the island of Bornholm in easternmost Denmark.

Short history
The county was established in 1662, replacing the former Hammershus Len. It was the only county unchanged by the administrative reforms of 1793 and 1970 consequently occupying the same territory from 1662 until 2002. Before the reform in 1970 there were 21 municipalities on the island, of which 6 market city municipalities (Danish: købstadskommuner) and 15 parish municipalities (sognekommuner).

The 6 market city municipalities were supervised by the county, differing from the situation in the rest of Denmark where the market city municipalities were supervised by the Interior ministry. This distinction ended in 1970, and since then only the term kommune (municipality) is used.

Decided in a referendum on the island May 29, 2001, as of January 1, 2003, the county and the island's five municipalities merged forming the new Bornholm Regional Municipality (Bornholms Regionskommune). It is supervised by the State Administration of Greater Copenhagen (Statsforvaltningen Hovedstaden).

List and map of former hundreds (herreder) and municipalities
 Nørre
 Sønder
 Vester
 Øster

List of municipalities (1970-2002)
Aakirkeby municipality
Allinge-Gudhjem municipality
Hasle municipality
Nexø municipality
Rønne municipality

This article is based on the corresponding article on the Danish Wikipedia  accessed on March 24, 2006.''

Former counties of Denmark (1970–2006)